Highway 18 is a highway in the Canadian province of Saskatchewan. It passes through three major communities, all in the eastern quarter of Saskatchewan – Estevan, Oxbow, and Carnduff; it also passes north of the west and east blocks of Grasslands National Park.

History
In the 1960s, Highway 18 was extended west to Highway 6 near Minton along an upgraded grid road, resulting in the north-south section between Lake Alma and Highway 13 being renumbered as Highway 28. In the 1970s, Highway 18 was again extended west along a series of upgraded country roads and existing highways – former highways include Highway 336 between Coronach and Rockglen; Highway 319 between Wood Mountain and Highway 19 near Mankota; and Highway 46 between Highway 4 near Orkney and Claydon.

Major intersections 
From west to east:

See also
Roads in Saskatchewan
Transportation in Saskatchewan

References

018
Transport in Estevan